The 1965 Tipperary Senior Hurling Championship was the 75th staging of the Tipperary Senior Hurling Championship since its establishment by the Tipperary County Board in 1887. The championship began on 10 October 1965 and ended on 21 November 1965.

Thurles Sarsfields were the defending champions.

On 21 November 1965, Thurles Sarsfields won the championship after a 3-11 to 2-07 defeat of Carrick Davins in the final at Clonmel Sportsfield. It was their 27th championship title overall and their fifth title in succession. It was also their 10th championship title in 11 seasons.

Results

Quarter-finals

Semi-finals

Finals

Championship statistics

Miscellaneous

 Thurles Sarsfields win their second five in a row and 10th title in 11 seasons.

References

Tipperary
Tipperary Senior Hurling Championship